The 2022 DMCB Hockey Champions Trophy Bangladesh (Bengali: ডিএমসিবি হকি চ্যাম্পিয়নস ট্রফি বাংলাদেশ ২০২২) is the inaugural season of the professional field hockey league Hockey Champions Trophy Bangladesh which is organized by Bangladesh Hockey Federation (BHF) and ACE. The tournament started from 28 October and will end in 17 November 2022.

Venue
All matches will played at Maulana Bhasani Hockey Stadium in Dhaka, Bangladesh.

Players draft
The players draft took place in Dhaka on 10 October.     

The World Cup playing players are —Argentina’s Juan Martin Lopez (2006, 2010, 2014, 2018) and Guido Barreiros (2014), India’s SV Sunil (2014, 2018), Chinglesana Singh (2014, 2018) and Jasjit Singh (2014), Malaysia’s Azri Hasan (2018) and Fitri Saari (2014, 2018).   

A total of 186 local players and 30 foreign players were listed before the draft, and of those, 108 local and six foreign players remained unsold.   

The local players were categorised as icon, A plus, A, B and C category players, while foreign players were as icon, A, B and six in reserved category players, listed before the draft. 

The listed 30-foreign players in the list are from 10 countries – seven each from India and Malaysia, three from South Korea, two each from Argentina, Germany, Pakistan, Indonesia, Oman and the Netherlands, and one from Japan.

Icon players : Milon Hossain, Rasel Mahmud Jimmy, Ashraful Islam, Khorshedur Rahman, Farhad Ahmed Shitul, Deen Islam Emon, Fazle Hossain Rabbi, Sarwar Hossain, Roman Sarkar, Nayeem Uddin, Biplob Kujur, Sohanur Rahman Sabuj, Mehdi Hasan, Arshad Hossain, Pushkor Khisha Mimo, Abu Sayeed Nippon, Rezaul Karim Babu, Prince Lal and Rakibul Hasan Rocky

Participating teams
On 8 September 2022 Bangladesh Hockey Federation have announced the name of participating teams.

Personnel and kits
The Bangladesh Hockey Federation have announced the Head coaches name of the teams on 26 September 2022.

Teams on the map

Point table

  advances to the Qualifier 1
  advances to the Eliminator

League stage matches

Playoffs

Qualifier-1

Eilimanator

Qualifiers 2

Final

Statistics

Top Goal Scorers

Awards 
Man of the match (final) - Arshad
Most promising player - Obaidul Haque Joy
Best Goalkeeper - Asim Gope
Highest Scorer - Devindar Walmiki

Player of the tournament - Devindar Walmiki 
Fairplay award - Metro Express Barishal

Sponsors 
Title Sponsor
DMCB
Associate Sponsors
Banglalink
Prime Bank
Asian Paints
Share Trip
Holiday Inn
Aamra

References

Field hockey in Bangladesh
Field hockey competitions in Bangladesh
Sport in Dhaka
Champions Trophy Bangladesh